Duck Creek is a  long 3rd order tributary to Smyrna River in New Castle County, Delaware.

Variant names
According to the Geographic Names Information System, it has also been known historically as:  
Ancke Kijhlen
Ende Kil
Green Branch
Old Duck Creek
Quinquingo Cipus
Smyrna River

Course
Duck Creek is formed in Duck Creek Pond at the confluence of Green Spring Branch and Providence Creek at Smyrna, Delaware.

Watershed

See also
List of rivers of Delaware

References 

Rivers of Delaware
Rivers of New Castle County, Delaware
Tributaries of the Smyrna River